Abajobir is a surname. Notable people with the surname include:

Ababiya Abajobir, Ethiopian activist
Kemeria Abajobir Abajifar (born 1972), Ethiopian princess, niece of Ababiya

Surnames of African origin